Gattyana brunnea is a scale worm described from the North Pacific Ocean off the coast of California at a depth of about 550 m.

Description
Gattyana brunnea is a short-bodied worm with 32 segments and 18 pairs of elytra, which bear a marginal fringe of papillae. The lateral antennae are positioned terminally on the prostomium continuing along its margin. Notochaetae are thinner than the  neurochaetae.

References

Phyllodocida